Shreveport Operations, officially the Shreveport Assembly and Stamping Plant, was a General Motors vehicle factory in Shreveport, Louisiana. The  factory opened in 1981 and produced the company's compact pickup trucks along with Moraine Assembly in Dayton, Ohio. At one time 3,000 employees were on the payroll. Construction of the plant began in 1978. In 2002 expansion included a new stamping facility.

The plant closed in August 2012 with the last truck being produced, a white Chevrolet Colorado.  On the front of the vehicle, a banner read, "4,853,693rd". The Final vehicle that was assembled at the plant. At the time just over 800 hourly and salaried workers were employed there.

Elio Motors had announced plans to begin using the facility in 2014 to manufacture a new three-wheeled vehicle. The production date has since been moved back to 2017. Elio is working with production equipment manufacturer Comau, to sell off additional unneeded equipment at the factory.

Glovis America, a subsidiary of Hyundai Motor Group, acquired 125,000 square feet of the plant for use as a distribution center of Hyundai and Kia vehicles. Glovis also leases 90 acres at this site.

Products
 1982–1990 GMC S-15
 1982–2004 Chevrolet S-10
 1991 GMC Syclone
 1991–2004 GMC Sonoma
 1996–2000 Isuzu Hombre
 2004–2012 Chevrolet Colorado
 2004–2012 GMC Canyon
 2006–2010 Hummer H3
 2006–2008 Isuzu i-Series
 2009–2010 Hummer H3T

References

External links
 

General Motors factories
Former motor vehicle assembly plants
Motor vehicle assembly plants in Louisiana
Buildings and structures in Shreveport, Louisiana
Economy of Shreveport, Louisiana
1981 establishments in Louisiana